Drum Point is a census-designated place (CDP) in southern Calvert County, Maryland, United States, at the confluence of the Patuxent River with Chesapeake Bay. As of the 2010 census, the CDP had a population of 2,731. Prior to 2010 it was part of the Chesapeake Ranch Estates-Drum Point CDP.

Demographics

References 

Census-designated places in Calvert County, Maryland
Census-designated places in Maryland
Maryland populated places on the Chesapeake Bay
Lusby, Maryland